The Norwegian Writers' Center is an organization of Norwegian poets and fiction writers that encourages interactions among writers and the general public. It is funded by the Norwegian Ministry of Culture and Church Affairs and promotes literacy through poetry readings, public talks, conferences, presentations in schools, and cultural events. Writers resident in Norway having published at least one work of fiction (novels, poetry and children's books), are eligible for membership.

The Norwegian Writers' Center was established in 1968 under the initiative of the authors Einar Økland, Bjørn Nilsen and Tor Obrestad. Today the writer's center has over 900 author and has offices in Oslo, Bergen, Trondheim and Tromsø. The current leader, resident since 2001 is the author Tom Lotherington.

See also

References

External links
Official website

Norwegian literature
1968 establishments in Norway
Organizations established in 1968